Kripanath Mallah (born 15 October 1973) is an Indian politician serving as the Member of Parliament in the 17th Lok Sabha from Karimganj constituency of Assam. He is a member of the Bharatiya Janata Party. He had been elected in Assam Legislative Assembly election in 2011 and 2016 from Ratabari constituency.

Previously, he was a member of Indian National Congress from Ratabari constituency in 2011.

Early life
Mallah was born on 15 October 1973 and hails from Bidyanagar village (Bidyanagar Tea Estate) in Karimganj district. He obtained a Bachelor of Science degree from Karimganj College, Assam University in 1997. He started his political journey by participating in Goan panchayat i. e. becoming the Goan panchayat president, then on climbing to the position of MLA, then on to the member of Lok sabha and parliament. The fact that the constituency is reserved for SC quota is also a major factor for him being the MP of the constituency.

References

External links
Elections in Assam

1973 births
Living people
Bharatiya Janata Party politicians from Assam
Assam MLAs 2011–2016
Assam MLAs 2016–2021
People from Karimganj district
Indian National Congress politicians
India MPs 2019–present
Indian National Congress politicians from Assam